"Love Is Dead" is the first single from Brett Anderson's first solo album, Brett Anderson. It was released on two CD singles and 7" vinyl. A download bundle was also available. The sleeve was designed by Peter Saville, with photography by Wolfgang Tillmans. The music video was directed by Russell Thomas.

The single reached number 42 on the UK Singles Chart. It was well-received by critics. Dom Gourlay of Contactmusic.com felt that Anderson sounded more "mature" on this song compared to his work with The Tears, while NME considered the song "rather decent." The Daily Record considered it to be one of the best songs Anderson had written, saying, "Aching violins push this mid-tempo rocker into the realms of a classic."

Track listing
CD1
 Love Is Dead – 3:35
 Clowns – 3:39

CD2
 Love Is Dead – 3:35
 We Can Be Anyone – 3:37
 Mother Night – 2:50

7"
 Love Is Dead
 Elegant

Download
 Love Is Dead – 3:35
 Clowns – 3:39
 We Can Be Anyone – 3:37
 Mother Night – 2:50
 Elegant
 Love Is Dead (Live at Bush Hall) – 3:34
 Clowns (Live at Bush Hall) – 3:39

References

2007 singles
Songs written by Brett Anderson
2006 songs
Songs written by Fred Ball (producer)